Ficus verruculosa, the water fig, is a species of fig from sub-saharan Africa.

It is found from north eastern South Africa, northern Botswana and Namibia to Uganda and west to Nigeria in riverine and swamp fringes or grassland, always near water.  It is pollinated by the wasp Platyscapa binghami.

The growth form of Ficus verruculosa is as a shrub, or weak-stemmed, sparsely branched shrub 0.2-0.6 m tall, less often a small tree up to 12m, often forming low, creeping thickets. Leaves oblong to lanceolate, 3.5-20 x 1.5-8.5 cm, leathery, hairless. Figs are produced mostly in pairs in leaf axils, greenish when unripe, ripening to red and are fed on by African green pigeons Treron calvus.

References

External links
 

verruculosa